CNBC Awaaz is an Indian pay television Hindi business news channel, owned by CNBC and TV18 based in New Delhi.

CNBC Awaaz launched 'CNBC Awaaz Travel Awards'.

References

External links 
 
 Staff, The Business Standard.  23 May 2003 Tv 18, Cnbc Plan Joint Venture

 
Mass media in Mumbai
Mass media in Maharashtra
Television stations in Mumbai
CNBC global channels
Network18 Group
24-hour television news channels in India
Business-related television channels in India
Business-related television channels
Television channels and stations established in 2005
2005 establishments in Maharashtra